is the name for the earthly remains of a castle structure in Kozukue, Kōho-ku ward of Yokohama, Kanagawa Prefecture, Japan.

History 
The main grounds are located on the top of a hill surrounded with trees. It is not clear when the Castle was built but probably founded by Uesugi clan, around 1438.
During the siege of Odawara in 1590 by Toyotomi Hideyoshi, the castle was given up without resistance.

Today 
The castle is now only ruins, with some earthen walls and moats. In 2017, the castle　was　listed as one of　the Continued Top 100 Japanese Castles.

Kozukue castle remains are located on the outskirts of Yokohama, close to Kozukue Station on JR Yokohama line.
About 15 minutes by walk from Kozukue Station.

Gallery

References

Castles in Kanagawa Prefecture
Former castles in Japan
Ruined castles in Japan
Go-Hōjō clan